The Kids from Room 402 is an animated series produced by CinéGroupe and Saban Entertainment that premiered on October 9, 1999 on the Fox Family Channel in the USA, and on August 29, 2000 on Teletoon in Canada. It consists of 52 half-hour episodes, the last of which aired in 2000, with reruns airing until 2005. The series was also seen in Latin America and Europe on Fox Kids, with the latter region still airing the series after the Fox Kids channels were purchased by Disney and changed their name to Jetix; remaining on their schedule until the Jetix channels were once again rebranded as Disney XD.

The series is focused primarily on a group of elementary school students. Miss Graves, their teacher, is usually shown as an interlocutor in the issues and injustices that are inflicted upon the students, whether the dilemmas be internal or external. Each episode usually ends with a substantiated moral or lesson resulting from such aforementioned situations.

The series is based on the 40-page children's book Gracie Graves and The Kids from Room 402 by Betty Paraskevas and Michael Paraskevas, published in 1995. This was retitled in 2000 as simply "The Kids from Room 402" to match the series.

The animated series was story edited and developed for television by Lesa Kite and Cindy Begel, who wrote all 52 episodes.

Characters

Kids from Room 402
Nancy Francis (voiced by Mindy Cohn/Patricia Rodriguez) - Nancy is a redheaded girl with horn-rimmed glasses. Nancy has snobbish tendencies and though is spending a lot of time trying to make herself popular is a good learner being a top student being a straight-A student. Also she always trying to fit in and helps Jesse out a lot because he is picked on. Albeit good-natured, she is sometimes bossy. She is always trying to befriend Penny, but she is unsuccessful at that. Sometimes will ended up being "friends" with Polly McShane who she resists instead. She is the main protagonist as well as Jesse.
Jesse McCoy (voiced by Spencer Klein/Shawn Pyfrom/Justin Bradley) - Jesse is the dumbest kid in the school, and he is often verbally picked on by his friends, including Vinnie, because his mother treats him like a baby. Whenever he has a hard task or homework to do, he usually gets out of it by telling a lie to Miss Graves or sometimes his mother, but both of them catch on and give him several punishments. Jesse is bald and wears an orange sweater with blue jeans.
Vincent "Vinnie" Nasta (voiced by Andrew Lawrence/Pamela Adlon) - Vinnie is the prankster of the class. He is a tall Italian-American boy who likes to pull pranks on people. Even Miss Graves. Based on that, he tends to be a thorn in her side, to the point where she so often threatens to call his mother on him whenever he tries them on her. Vinnie wears a football jersey and has spiky brown hair. He is also friends with Jesse, and the two pull pranks together on some reason, although sometimes he picks on Jesse mainly due to how his mother treats him. Vinnie has an older brother named Tony, whose past school projects Vinnie often tries to pass as his own but Miss Graves always remembers having already evaluated them during Tony's time. Vinnie once lost his friends when they learned his aunt married Mr. Besser but fortunately the wedding was short-lived.
Polly McShane (voiced by Colleen O'Shaughnessey) - Polly, a proud Lithuanian-American, is considered a "teacher's pet" in both demeanor and appearance. Polly is extremely intelligent (she is highly gifted and earned a score of 152 SD 15 - 99.97365 percentile - on the IQ test as was revealed in the episode HIQ) and has glasses, brown hair and a red and blue-striped dress. The other children, including the staff, can usually detect her presence due to her constant yodeling and obnoxious and intense disposition, especially on a count of her loud voice. She has an obsession with spoons. She is also well known for wanting to be the life of the party and be on top of everything, and for being a gossip and tattletale to the heads of the class over other children she catches behaving badly. For all of these reasons, she is a major thorn in the flesh of everyone, especially Nancy and Miss Graves. She has a pet goat named Schnitzy.
Penny Grant (voiced by Tara Strong) - Penny is one of the wealthiest girls in the entire school, as well as a very charitable and kind person. Penny is not a snob despite the common stereotype following rich kids in modern-day animation. She has blonde hair and blue eyes that helps her fit in very nicely. She is faithful and voluntarily participate to social programs in order to help other people. Also she is intelligent, hard working and a bright student, often earning the best results on the class. Nancy and the other girls from the class try to befriend her because of how wealthy and kind she is, but sometimes Penny doesn't even realize that she is rich, and that Nancy and the other girls are always trying to befriend her (although she doesn't despise them).
Arthur Kenneth Van Der Wall (voiced by Christopher Marquette) - An upper-class Dutch-American boy who is usually attempting to sell abnormally extravagant goods to the other children in the class. He has auburn hair and wears a blue suit. He is smart, clever and practical but also has a very shy personality. He often tries to profit from others, but usually his plans fail.
Freddie Fay (voiced by Bryton McClure) - Freddie is basically classified as a nerd boy in the school and he often bemoans that fact. He has glasses, black hair, wears a yellow shirt and sticks out as an easily found school nerd. He works very hard to have good results and is an A− student. Being silly is frequently mocked by the others, especially Vinnie and Jesse, or fooled by Arthur who sometimes uses him in his plans. E.g. in one episode everyone picked on him because they thought he had wet his pants, when actually the water fountain sprayed him by accident.
Charlie (voiced by Crystal Scales) - An African-American boy who looks slightly similar to Sanjay, with dark hair and a red shirt. He often wins what Nancy should have won. In one episode, the class switched seats to fool Mr. Besser when he became a substitute teacher, and when Nancy's report was worth an A, Mr. Besser mistook her for Charlie due to the seating arrangement plans (since he knew few of the students' names except for Jesse and Vinnie, whom he often put in detention). And when Jesse got glasses that he couldn't see with, he was the swing vote between Nancy and Charlie, and, while intending to vote for Nancy, voted for Charlie by mistake because he couldn't see the names clearly.
Jordan (voiced by Tara Strong) - A Chinese-American girl who is very rich, but keeps that in a secret. Nancy finds out in one episode, promising Jordan to keep the secret out of fear her friends will think she's a snob. To keep them from knowing, she did not invite anyone to her house, which caused some people to think she's poor. However, when Nancy bragged so much about having a wealthy friend (without telling anyone she was referring to Jordan) her other friends started avoiding her like Jordan feared would happen to her if they knew she was wealthy.
Gabrielle (voiced by Olivia Hack) - A girl who is usually seen with Jordan and Nancy. She mostly goes along with everything Jordan thinks or does, and although she is Nancy's friend, sometimes argues with her.
Tillie (voiced by Tifanie Christun) - Another of Nancy's friends, a tall girl with brown hair who is somewhat self-absorbed.
Jenny (voiced by Jane Woods) - A girl with red glasses who doesn't have much participation in the class.
Piggy McCall (voiced by Justin Jon Ross) - A slightly fat boy with glasses who is also a minor character, and doesn't interact much with the others.
Melanie Bellanchof (voiced by Debi Derryberry) - A new student to the school, she is Mrs. Bellanchof's daughter, her parents are either divorced or split up, as Melanie comes to town to live with her mother. She doesn't like living with her, and when referring to anything that she doesn't like will say either "Don't know", "Don't care" or "Smells". At her house, she is mostly seen on the phone talking to a friend from her old school named Gloria.

Other kids
Sanjay (voiced by Tara Strong) - An Indian-American student with dark brown hair, a maroon shirt, and speaks with an accent, who looks slightly similar to Charlie. He is often irritated by Polly.
Mary-Ellen (voiced by Colleen O'Shaughnessey) - A girl who is one of Nancy's friends. Doesn't have much participation in the series.
Joey Tuna - A tall boy who is often seen sitting next to Jesse in the series. Another character that doesn't have much participation in the series.
Zack (voiced by Sam Saletta) - The bully of the school and a recurring antagonist.

Adults
Miss Gracie Graves (voiced by April Winchell) - Miss Gracie Graves is a really good teacher. She acts as the voice of reason, which is why most of her students go to her whenever they seek help or advice.
Mr. Stuart Besser (voiced by Rodger Bumpass) - Mr. Stuart Besser is the incompetent principal of the school. Noted for his stupidity and overweight stature, he is often satirized, whether it be vocal or written, by his students. His negligence and ignorance serves as recurring comic relief within the television show. Mr. Besser was once married to Vinnie's aunt, much to the shock of both males (Vinnie didn't know Mr. Besser was his aunt's husband and Mr. Besser didn't know Vinnie is his wife's nephew until the two of them met during the wedding party) but the wedding ended when she learned he expected to live at her expenses. Mr. Besser was oblivious to the fact Vinnie didn't like being his nephew.
Nurse Pitts (voiced by Lori Alan) - The school nurse. She's obsessed with illness and also talks a lot about death. The kids, as well as the teachers, are scared of her.
Coach (voiced by Bruce Dinsmore) - The school gym teacher.
Roberta McCoy (voiced by Edie McClurg) - Jesse's overprotective mother. She usually treats Jesse like a baby and embarrasses him near his friends who sometimes mock him.
Mrs. Amy Bellanchof (voiced by Pauline Little) - Melanie's mother who is a teacher attending Melanie's new school. However, as she didn't have a lesson plan, her students made a bit progress, which put her on the verge of getting fired. Although Miss Graves helped her improve her class by sharing her lesson plan, Mrs. Bellanchof dishonestly passed Miss Graves' plan as her own to win an award. In other acts that show her lack of honesty, she got custody of her daughter by lying to the judge about which parent Melanie would rather live with, and used her position at the school to have her daughter join the cheerleading squad despite Melanie trying to tell her she doesn't want to be a cheerleader. She also loses her temper easily, especially when Melanie complains and tells her she wants to go back to live with her father, pulling her hair and screaming when she is overly angry or stressed.
Mrs. Francis (voiced by April Winchell) - Nancy's mother.

Cameo adults
Mrs. Myerson (voiced by April Winchell) - She is a stout woman with a very pleasant and respectable disposition. She wears a pink dress and has blonde hair. She lives in a neighborhood around the school. She briefly appears a few times in the episode "Bing, Bing, Bing, and a Shot".
Mr. Miller (voiced by Mel Brooks) - He is the pool official of a pool in Miami that Nancy goes to visit. He gives her a hard time about things like hygiene. He appears in the episode "Squeezed Out".

Episodes

Season 1 (2000)

Season 2 (2000–01)

Home media

Canada
On April 8, 2003, CinéGroupe Star released a set of three VHS tapes called "Double Trouble"/"Sacré Délire", which featured an episode each from this show and What's with Andy?, alongside a music video from the Pig City tie-in album "Reggie and the Rashers". Volume 1 featured the episode "Over the River and Through the Swamp", Volume 2 featured the episode "All Polly All The Day", and Volume 3 featured the episode "The Anti-Mucous Forming, Artery Clogging, Energy Zapping Diet". The releases were sold in separate English and French versions, respectively.

References

External links

1990s American animated television series
2000s American animated television series
1999 American television series debuts
2001 American television series endings
1990s Canadian animated television series
2000s Canadian animated television series
1999 Canadian television series debuts
2001 Canadian television series endings
American television shows based on children's books
American children's animated comedy television series
Canadian children's animated comedy television series
Canadian television shows based on children's books
Jetix original programming
Fox Family Channel original programming
Animated television series about children
English-language television shows
Teletoon original programming
Television shows filmed in Montreal
Television series by Saban Entertainment